Ida Nilsen is a Canadian indie pop singer-songwriter and musician. She has been a member of the bands Radiogram, The Violet Archers, The Beans, The Gay, The Buttless Chaps and The Choir Practice, and has appeared as a guest musician on albums by P:ano, Jerk With a Bomb, Montag and Veda Hille.

She formed her own band, Great Aunt Ida, in 2003. That band released its debut album, Our Fall, in 2005. Great Aunt Ida's second album How They Fly was released at the Railway Club in Vancouver on September 21, 2006. In a favourable review, critic Jennifer Van Evra wrote, "the album's simultaneously warm and spare arrangements give it an understated power".

In October 2007, Nilsen moved from Vancouver to Toronto.  She resided there settling in Parkdale writing the songs that were to become "Nuclearize Me", which Now Magazine described as "Reminiscent of Belle & Sebastian’s fuller late-period material, it’s steady and sure, intimate and honest, with songs that are so damn smartly crafted.", recorded with Dave Draves at Little Bullhorn Studios in Ottawa.   In 2012, Nilsen moved to Detroit, MI with her husband, songwriter Jay Clark Reid. In 2015, Nilsen moved back to Vancouver.

In 2021 she released Unsayable, her fourth album and her first in a decade.

Discography
Our Fall (2005)
How They Fly (2006)
Nuclearize Me (2011)
Unsayable (2021)

References

External links
 

Year of birth missing (living people)
Living people
Musicians from Vancouver
Canadian people of Norwegian descent
Canadian singer-songwriters
Canadian indie rock musicians
Canadian indie pop musicians
Nilsen, Ida